Fluxys is a Belgium-based company, mainly acting as a natural gas transmission system operator. The company is listed on Euronext Brussels market.

History 
The company was created in 2001 from the breakup of Distrigas into two entities (the other entity has kept the name Distrigas). Suez held as much as 57.25% of Fluxys shares prior to its 2008 merger with Gaz de France to form GDF Suez (now Engie), but was obligated to reduce its stake to satisfy the concerns of the European Commissioner for Competition. Engie still retains 44.75% of Fluxys as of July 2008.

As of 7 April 2014, when ice precludes the LNG shipments from Yamal LNG at Sabetta along the Northern Sea Route, the Fluxys terminal at Zeebrugge will serve Russia as its LNG port for the Asia-Pacific region.

See also 

2004 explosions in Ghislenghien

References

External links 

Oil and gas companies of Belgium
Companies based in Brussels
Natural gas pipeline companies
Companies in the BEL Mid Index
Engie